Zulfiya Garipova (born 20 November 1969) is a Russian judoka. She competed in the women's lightweight event at the 1996 Summer Olympics.

References

1969 births
Living people
Russian female judoka
Olympic judoka of Russia
Judoka at the 1996 Summer Olympics
Sportspeople from Kazan
20th-century Russian women